Cielos del Oriente was a Peruvian charter airline. The airline's hub is situated at the Cad. FAP Guillermo del Castillo Paredes Airport in Tarapoto. They operated charter flights throughout the jungle.
The airline ceased operations in 2014.

Accidents
On July 27, 2002 a Cessna T210N crashed in Bolognesi. The captain and two passengers had minor injuries and three passengers were uninjured.

Destinations
 Bolognesi
 Iquitos
 Pucallpa 
 Tarapoto Hub
 Yurimaguas

Fleet
Cessna 206 
Cessna 210

References

Defunct airlines of Peru